The 1998 Shreveport mayoral election resulted in the defeat of Republican incumbent  Robert W. "Bo" Williams by Democratic councilman Keith Hightower. As Hightower did not win at least 50% of the vote in the primary, he and mayor Williams were entitled to a run-off election. However, Williams declined to run in the second round making Hightower the mayor-elect after the first round of voting.

Results

|}

References

Shreveport
Government of Shreveport, Louisiana
1998 Louisiana elections
October 1998 events in the United States